Nathaniel  “Noddy” Reilly-O'Donnell (born 13 April 1988) is a British rower educated at St Leonard's School, Durham and University College London.

Biography

Junior
Started rowing age 12 at St Leonard's School, Durham. At the 2005 World Junior Championships, he finished 7th overall in the coxed four.  At U16 level, he competed in the pair in the J16 GB v France Match.  Both he and the GB team won the match.  In 2006, he became World Junior Champion in the men's four.

As a Great Britain squad captain at the 2007 Youth Olympic Festival in Australia, Noddy won three medals: two golds in the coxless four and the pair, and a silver in the eight. In the 2009 World Championships in Račice he won a bronze medal at the World U23 Championships in the men's eight.

Senior
At the 2011 World Rowing Championships in Bled, Nathaniel and crew mates Alex Partridge, James Foad, Cameron Nichol, Moe Sbihi, Greg Searle, Tom Ransley, Daniel Ritchie and Phelan Hill won a silver medal in the men's eight.

During the 2011 World Cup Series he raced in the men's eight, taking a silver medal behind Germany in Munich and a bronze in Lucerne. He competed at the 2014 World Rowing Championships in Bosbaan, Amsterdam, where he won a gold medal as part of the eight.

In the 2015 season he won gold in the men's four at the 2015 European Rowing Championships in Poznan, along with crewmates Alan Sinclair, Tom Ransley and Scott Durant. The same crew finished fifth at the World Cup in Varese. He was part of the British team that topped the medal table at the 2015 World Rowing Championships at Lac d'Aiguebelette in France, where he won a gold medal as part of the coxed pair with Matthew Tarrant and Henry Fieldman.

Achievements

Junior World Championships
2005 – 7th, Coxed Four
2006 Bosbaan – Gold, Coxless Four

World U23 Championships
2007 6th, Men's Eight
2008 5th, Men's Eight
2009 Račice – Bronze, Men's Eight
2010 Brest – Silver, Men's Eight

World Championships
2011 Bled – Silver, Men's Eight
2013 Chungju – 5th, Coxless Four
2014 Amsterdam – Gold, Men's Eight
2015 Aiguebelette – Gold, Men's Coxed Pair

European Rowing Championships
 2008 6th, Men's Eight
 2014 4th, Coxless Pair
 2015 Poznan – Gold, Coxless Four

World Cups
2011 Lucerne – Bronze, Eight
2011 Munich – Silver, Eight
2012 Belgrade – Silver, Eight

External links
 British Rowing Biography
 
 World Rowing Under 23 Championships

References

1988 births
Living people
People from Ealing
English male rowers
British male rowers
Alumni of University College London
Rowers from Greater London
World Rowing Championships medalists for Great Britain
European Rowing Championships medalists